Mountain Academy of Teton Science Schools (formerly Journeys School) is a Pre-K through 12th grade independent school affiliated with Teton Science Schools.

History
Teton Science Schools operate in partnership with Grand Teton National Park and were founded in 1967 when Ted Major, a high school biology teacher, led twelve high school students on six weeks of field research in the Greater Yellowstone Ecosystem. The organization began offering outreach programs to regional public and independent schools in 1991, developing what would eventually be formalized as the Journeys Curriculum. Mountain Academy of Teton Science Schools was officially established as an independent school and a program of Teton Science Schools in 2001. Mountain Academy of Teton Science Schools partners with the Teacher Learning Center of Teton Science Schools to offer professional development to visiting teachers.

Academics
Mountain Academy of Teton Science Schools is an accredited member of the Pacific Northwest Association of Independent Schools. As an independent, non-profit school that has received full accreditation from an approved accrediting program, Mountain Academy of Teton Science Schools is a full member of the National Association of Independent Schools. Mountain Academy of Teton Science Schools is an International Baccalaureate World School and is authorized to offer the IB Diploma Program to students aged 16–19. Classes in the Pre-K are based on the Reggio Emilia approach. All students in grades 9 - 11 take the PSAT (Pre-Scholastic Aptitude Test).

Honor code
According to the school's website, three of the values most important to the Mountain Academy of Teton Science Schools community are as follows:

 Students and faculty try hard by working to their full potential at all times
 Students and faculty treat others with respect by honoring diverse opinions and backgrounds, representing themselves and the school with high standards
 Students and faculty take responsibility for their own actions and their own learning

Campus and buildings

It comprises 9 new buildings totalling , all designed and constructed on environmental principles, and occupying less than 2% of the site's area. In addition to classrooms, dining facilities and administrative areas, the campus includes two lodges for visiting students and summer workshops, and a Teachers' Learning Center. The architects were Mithun of Seattle.

References

External links
 Mountain Academy of Teton Science Schools website
 Place-Based Education
"I am Journeys" Video

Schools in Teton County, Wyoming
Private middle schools in Wyoming
Private elementary schools in Wyoming
Private high schools in Wyoming
Educational institutions established in 2001
2001 establishments in Wyoming